Josef Pfeiffer (born 1884, date of death unknown) was a Bohemian épée, foil and sabre fencer. He competed in four events at the 1912 Summer Olympics.

References

External links
 

1884 births
Year of death unknown
Czech male épée fencers
Olympic fencers of Bohemia
Fencers at the 1912 Summer Olympics
Czech male foil fencers
Czech male sabre fencers
Sportspeople from the Austro-Hungarian Empire